Chris Mercer may refer to:
 Chris Mercer (activist), the first African-American state deputy prosecutor in the southern United States
 Chris Mercer, saxophonist with the band Juicy Lucy
 Chris Harper Mercer,  perpetrator of the 2015 Umpqua Community College shooting